Brits Airfield (ICAO-Code: FABS) is a small airfield located in Brits, South Africa. It mainly facilitates light and ultra-light aircraft as well as Gliders.

Communication 
 Communication Frequencies
 Brits Airfield 124.20 MHz (Unmanned)

Notes 
The airfield has Landing Lights. As these are not automated, arrangements need to be made in advance.
 The following fuel is available:
 AVGAS 100 LL 
 MOGAS (only by arrangement)

References 

Airports in South Africa